Valley Township is a township in Page County, Iowa, USA.

History
Valley Township is named from a valley upon the Nodaway River, which was covered with valuable timber at the time of settlement.

References

Townships in Page County, Iowa
Townships in Iowa